Peter William Vanderkaay (born February 12, 1984) is an American former competition swimmer who specialized in middle-distance freestyle events and is a four-time Olympic medalist. He was a member of the United States Olympic team in 2004, 2008, and 2012, and won bronze medals in the 200-meter freestyle at the 2008 Summer Olympics and the 400-meter freestyle at the 2012 Summer Olympics.

Personal life
Vanderkaay was born in Royal Oak, Michigan. He grew up in Oakland Township, and attended Rochester Adams High School in Rochester Hills. He has three brothers, all of whom are competitive swimmers.  His older brother Christian swam for the University of Michigan and qualified for the 100-meter breaststroke at the 2008 Olympic trials. His younger brother Alex qualified for the 2008 Olympic trials in several events, competing and making the finals in the 400-meter individual medley, 200-meter butterfly and the 200-meter medley.  His third and youngest brother, Dane, also qualified for the 2008 US Olympic trials in the 400-meter freestyle.

Vanderkaay and his family are supporters and volunteers for the YMCA's Detroit SWIMS initiative with a goal to teach every child in the City of Detroit to swim by the fifth grade.

Vanderkaay threw out the ceremonial first pitch at a Detroit Tigers baseball game on September 4, 2012.

Career

High school and college career

Peter Vanderkaay is a two-time Michigan high school state champion in the 500-yard freestyle (2001, 2002), and is the 2001 state champion in the 200-yard freestyle.  He graduated in the class of 2002, and swam for the Michigan Wolverines swimming and diving team at the University of Michigan in Ann Arbor, Michigan.

Vanderkaay captured four NCAA titles and 14 Big Ten Conference titles. He also won a silver and two bronze medals representing the US at the 2003 World University Games. In his first year in college, he was Big Ten Champion in the 500-yard freestyle and the 800-yard freestyle relay. He also was CSCAA All-American in the 500 and the mile.

By the end of his second year, he won four more Big Ten titles in the 400-yard IM, 500-yard freestyle, 1,650 freestyle and 800-yard freestyle relay. In short course metric distances, Vanderkaay also was the NCAA champion in the 400-meter free, the 1,500-meter free and the 800-meter free relay, and placed fifth in the 200-meter free.

In his junior year, Vanderkaay repeated his four Big Ten victories, and was named Big Ten Swimmer of the Year. He was named All-American in the 200-yard freestyle, 500-yard freestyle, 1,650-yard freestyle, 800-yard freestyle relay, 400-yard medley relay.  In his senior year at Michigan, he was the senior co-captain for the Michigan Wolverines. He won four more Big Ten titles, 200-yard freestyle, 500-yard freestyle, 1,650-yard freestyle and 800-yard freestyle relay, and one final NCAA title in the 500.  Vanderkaay also placed second in both the 200-yard and 1,650-yard freestyle events at the NCAA national championships.

International career

At the 2004 Summer Olympics, Vanderkaay was a member of the 4×200-meter freestyle relay team, along with Michael Phelps, Ryan Lochte, and Klete Keller, that beat the favored Australian team of Ian Thorpe, Grant Hackett, Michael Klim, and Nicholas Sprenger.

At the 2005 World Aquatics Championships in Montreal, Quebec, Vanderkaay won a gold medal in the 4×200-meter freestyle relay.  Along with Phelps, Lochte, and Keller, their time of 7:06.58 was an American record.

At the 2007 World Aquatics Championships in Melbourne, Australia, Vanderkaay again swam in the relay with Lochte, Phelps, Keller. They set a world record in the 4×200-meter freestyle relay with a time of 7:03.24.

In the summer of 2007, Vanderkaay posted a career performance at U.S. Nationals, beating Michael Phelps for first place in the 400-meter freestyle. Vanderkaay also teamed up with Phelps, Davis Tarwater, Scott Spann, and Chris DeJong to win two more golds, one in the 4×100-meter freestyle relay and another in the 4×100-meter medley relay.

Vanderkaay won his first individual medal, a bronze, in the 200-meter freestyle at the 2008 Summer Olympics.  Vanderkaay was part of the 4×200-meter freestyle relay that set the world record as the American team finished first with a time of 6:58.56.  The Americans were the first team to break the seven-minute mark in the relay, and broke the previous record, set in Melbourne by more than four and a half seconds.

On December 20, 2010, Vanderkaay announced that he would be leaving Ann Arbor and Club Wolverine, where he had trained for over eight years, to move to Gainesville, Florida and train with the Gator Swim Club.  The Gator Swim Club is affiliated with the University of Florida and is coached by Gregg Troy, the head coach of the 2012 U.S. Olympic men's team, and is home to several elite swimmers including Ryan Lochte, Conor Dwyer and Elizabeth Beisel.

At the 2012 United States Olympic Trials in Omaha, Nebraska, the qualifying event for the U.S. Olympic team, Vanderkaay won the 400-meter freestyle event with a time of 3:47.67, thus qualifying to represent the United States in the event at the 2012 Olympics.  He also competed in the 1,500-meter freestyle, but placed fourth.  At the 2012 Summer Olympics in London, Vanderkaay won a bronze medal in the 400-meter freestyle with a time of 3:44.69, finishing third behind Sun Yang and Park Tae-Hwan.

See also

 List of Olympic medalists in swimming (men)
 List of United States records in swimming
 List of University of Michigan alumni
 List of World Aquatics Championships medalists in swimming (men)
 Michigan Wolverines
 World record progression 4 × 200 metres freestyle relay

References

External links
 
 
 
 
 
 
 

1984 births
Living people
American male freestyle swimmers
American people of Dutch descent
World record setters in swimming
Medalists at the FINA World Swimming Championships (25 m)
Medalists at the 2012 Summer Olympics
Medalists at the 2008 Summer Olympics
Medalists at the 2004 Summer Olympics
Michigan Wolverines men's swimmers
Olympic bronze medalists for the United States in swimming
Olympic gold medalists for the United States in swimming
People from Rochester, Michigan
Sportspeople from Royal Oak, Michigan
Swimmers at the 2004 Summer Olympics
Swimmers at the 2008 Summer Olympics
Swimmers at the 2012 Summer Olympics
World Aquatics Championships medalists in swimming
Universiade medalists in swimming
Universiade silver medalists for the United States
Universiade bronze medalists for the United States
Medalists at the 2003 Summer Universiade
Big Ten Athlete of the Year winners